TRTC may refer to:
Taipei Rapid Transit System
Taipei Rapid Transit Corporation
Transnistrian Radio and Television Center
Turkish Radio and Television Corporation